Evelyne Christelle Atticia Tiron (born 21 April 1999) is a Romanian tennis player.

Tiron made her WTA Tour main draw debut at the 2021 Winners Open, where she received a wildcard to the singles event main draw.

Tiron played college tennis at the University of South Florida.

References

External links
 
 

1999 births
Living people
Tennis players from Bucharest
Romanian female tennis players
South Florida Bulls women's tennis players